Daniel Jacobus "Danie" Erasmus (11 December 1899 – c. 1975) was a rugby union player who represented Australia.

Erasmus, a wing, was born in Pretoria and won two international rugby caps for Australia.

References

Australian rugby union players
Australia international rugby union players
1899 births
1970s deaths
Rugby union players from Pretoria
Rugby union wings
South African emigrants to Australia